is a Japanese manga series written and illustrated by Masatoshi Kawahara. The story follows a young Karate practitioner named Tsukumo Mutsu, 40th master of the deadly Mutsu Enmei Ryu style. It was serialized in Kodansha's Monthly Shōnen Magazine from April 1987 to November 1996. The individual chapters were collected and published into 31 tankōbon volumes published between October 1987 and May 1997.

A prequel series, Mutsu Enmei-ryū Gaiden: Shura no Toki also ran in Monthly Shōnen Magazine, premiering in July 1989 and running until November 2005. Its chapters were published in 15 tankōbon volumes by Kodansha. It was adapted into a 26-episode anime series by Media Factory and Studio Comet that aired from April 6, 2004, until September 28, 2004, and is licensed for release in North America by Media Blasters.

Shura no Mon received the 1990 Kodansha Manga Award for the shōnen category, and has sold over 30 million copies. Two other spin-off series, Shura no Mon: Daini Mon and Shura no Mon: Fudekage, were published from 2010 to 2015 and 2010 to 2014, respectively.

Media

Manga
Written and illustrated by Masatoshi Kawahara, Shura no Mon was serialized in Monthly Shōnen Magazine from April 1987 to November 1996. The individual chapters were collected and published in Japan in 31 tankōbon volumes by Kodansha between October 8, 1987, and May 16, 1997.

A prequel series, began serialization in the same magazine in July 1989 where it ran until November 2005. It was collected and published in 15 tankōbon volumes between February 13, 1990, and January 17, 2006. Five aizōban volumes of the series were also released between March 19, 2004, and July 21, 2004.

The first was serialized from November 2010 to January 2015, and compiled into 16 volumes published from March 19, 2011, and April 17, 2015. The second one transformed Shura no Mons into a soccer manga. It was published from December 2010 to December 2014, and its eight volumes were released from June 17, 2011, to January 16, 2015.

Anime
Three of the story arcs from the prequel series were adapted into a 26-episode anime series by Media Factory and Studio Comet. It premiered on TV Tokyo on April 6, 2004, and ran until September 28, 2004. Media Blasters licensed the series for distribution in North America.

Video games
Only the Mega Drive game of the same name was released Japan and South Korea.

Reception
Shura no Mon received the 1990 Kodansha Manga Award for the shōnen category.

As of April 2015, the complete series had sold over 30 million copies in Japan.

References

External links
Kodansha - Shura no Mon

1987 manga
1989 manga
2004 anime television series debuts
2010 manga
Karate in anime and manga
Kodansha manga
Martial arts anime and manga
Shōnen manga
TV Tokyo original programming
Winner of Kodansha Manga Award (Shōnen)